Enes Kuşku (born 10 April 1994) is a Turkish rower.

References

External links
 

1994 births
Living people
Turkish male rowers
Place of birth missing (living people)
Mediterranean Games silver medalists for Turkey
Mediterranean Games medalists in rowing
Competitors at the 2013 Mediterranean Games